Abbasa can refer to:
 Abbasa, Iran, a village in northern Iran
 Abbasa bint al-Mahdi, 8th-century Abbasid princess
 Abbasa bint Sulayman, was the daughter of Abbasid prince Sulayman and wife of Abbasid caliph Harun al-Rashid (r. 786–809)